The N-113 is a highway in northern Spain.

It heads north past Muga (862m) onto the valley of the Rio Ebro. It crosses the Autopista AP-68, the N-232, Autovía A-15 and N-121.

National roads in Spain
Transport in Castile and León
Transport in Navarre